Dot and Keeto is a 1986 Australian animated film.

Plot
When Dot accidentally eats a magic root and shrinks to the size of an insect, she is suddenly alone in a world of giant creatures and overwhelming bushland. But her previous good deeds in rescuing a helpless mosquito and dragonfly from the peril of a spider's web, guarantee by two very reliable, helpful friends. With the aid of Keeto the mosquito, Butterwalk the caterpillar and a surprise visit from an old friend, Dot sets out on a grand adventure to discover a way to return to her original size.

Cast
 Robyn Moore — Dot (voice), Simon (voice), Mum (voice), Kangaroo, Possum, Wasp, misc.
 Keith Scott — Keeto, Butterwalk, Atlantis, Grasshopper, misc.
 Ashley Ayre — Dot (live-action segments)
 Leaf Nowland — Simon (live-action segments)
 Lucy Charles — Mum (live-action segments)

References

External links

Dot and Keeto at Oz Movies

1986 films
1980s Australian animated films
1980s children's animated films
1980s English-language films
1980s musical films
Animated films about insects
Australian animated feature films
Australian children's adventure films
Australian children's musical films
Films about size change
Films directed by Yoram Gross
Films with live action and animation
1980s Australian films
Flying Bark Productions films